Nathaniel Lamptey (born 7 June 1983 in Accra) is a Ghanaian football striker, he currently plays for Stay Cool Professionals.

Career
He started his career with Stay Cool Professionals, a division one club in Accra, in July 1998. In 2002 the youth side of Karlsruher SC signed him, in their quest to regain their division one status. In 2005 he left Germany and moved to Huddersfield Town A.F.C.'s reserve team, playing in the English lower leagues. After 7 years in Europe he returned to Stay Cool Professionals.

International
He presented the Black Starlets by the 1999 FIFA U-17 World Championship in New Zealand.

Personal life
Nathaniel is the younger brother of former Black Stars player Nii Lamptey.

References

External links
 Ghanaweb Profile

1983 births
Living people
Ghana international footballers
Ghanaian footballers
Karlsruher SC II players
Association football midfielders